Bob Jones (born 22 October 1961) is a former Australian rules footballer who played with St Kilda in the Victorian Football League (VFL).

Jones, an Indigenous Australian, grew up in Darwin, but came to St Kilda from Tasmanian club Devonport, at pick 44 of the 1987 National Draft. Already 26 when he made his debut for St Kilda in the 1988 VFL season, his 19 games that year were spent as a ruckman and in defence. He suffered a season ending knee injury (torn medial ligament) in the opening round of the 1989 season, against the Brisbane Bears at Moorabbin Oval. It would be his final appearance for St Kilda.

His son, Liam Jones, played for the Western Bulldogs before playing for Carlton.

References

1961 births
Australian rules footballers from the Northern Territory
St Kilda Football Club players
Devonport Football Club players
North Hobart Football Club players
Indigenous Australian players of Australian rules football
Living people